Vallam Pudursethi or Vallam Pudur is a village in Thanjavur taluk of Thanjavur district, in the Indian state of Tamil Nadu. It is located at a distance of 16 kilometres from Thanjavur and 4 kilometres from Vallam on the Thanjavur-Tiruchirapalli highway.

Demographics 

As per the 2001 census, Vallam Pudursethi had a population of 1130 with 570 males and 560 females. The sex ratio was 982 and the literacy rate, 74.67.

References 

 

Villages in Thanjavur district